Steve Capps is an American computer programmer, who was one of the designers of the original Apple Macintosh computer.

Capps started working at the Xerox Corporation while still a computer science student at the Rochester Institute of Technology. In 1981, Capps started working for Apple on the Lisa project and he continued his work on the Macintosh, principally writing the Finder (along with Bruce Horn) and Macintosh system utilities—such as ResEdit.

During a break in 1986, he wrote three music programs including Jam Session, SoundEdit, and Super Studio Session; SoundEdit was eventually sold to Macromedia. From 1987 to 1996, he was the chief architect and Apple Fellow for the Apple Newton, where he led the specification and development of the user interface of Newton, shepherded the team of software developers, and wrote many portions of the built-in application software. From 1996 until 2001, he was a user interface architect at Microsoft. His early work at Microsoft resulted in the Internet Explorer Search, History, and Favorites panes. He was also a co-founder of the MSN Explorer project.

As of 2010, he was working at Silicon Valley start-up Kwedit, now called PayNearMe, focusing on online payment systems. At that time, he was married to lawyer Marie D'Amico and had one child, Emma T Capps, who was born in 1997.

References

External links
Steve Capps Day at Apple
Steve Capps at the 'Newton Hall of Fame'
Steve Capps' user interface design company

American computer programmers
Apple Fellows
Living people
People from San Carlos, California
Year of birth missing (living people)
Berkeley Macintosh Users Group members